Marienberg is a town in Saxony, Germany.

Marienberg ("Mary's mountain" in German) may also refer to:

 Bad Marienberg, a town in the Westerwaldkreis of Rhineland-Palatinate 
 Marienberg Fortress, Würzburg, Bavaria, Germany
 Marienberg Abbey, a former Benedictine abbey near the village of Burgeis, South Tyrol, Italy
 Mariënberg, a small village in the municipality of Hardenberg in the Netherlands
 Baltic German name for Maarjamäe, Tallinn, Estonia
 Marienberg languages of Papua New Guinea
 Marienberg Hills of Papua New Guinea
 Marienberg, Papua New Guinea
 Marienberg Rural LLG of Papua New Guinea

See also
Marienburg (disambiguation)